Salvador Flores Huerta (17 February 1934 – 14 December 2018) was a Mexican Roman Catholic bishop.

Flores Huerta was born in Mexico and was ordained to the priesthood in 1958. He served as bishop of the Roman Catholic Diocese of Ciudad Lázaro Cárdenas, Mexico, from 1993 to 2006.

Notes

1934 births
2018 deaths
21st-century Roman Catholic bishops in Mexico
20th-century Roman Catholic bishops in Mexico